Yanek Kuchukov (born 24 August 1974) is a Bulgarian former football defender and currently manager of Marek Dupnitsa.

In the Bulgarian first division - the A PFG - Yanek has played in 171 matches and scored 11 goals.
Height - 1.87 m.
Weight - 76 kg.

Yanek has a brother, named Angelo, who is also a former professional footballer, having plied his trade for many of the same teams.

On 19 September 2016, Kyuchukov was appointed as manager of Marek Dupnitsa.

References

1974 births
Living people
Bulgarian footballers
First Professional Football League (Bulgaria) players
PFC Marek Dupnitsa players
PFC Minyor Pernik players
PFC Litex Lovech players
PFC Cherno More Varna players
Panserraikos F.C. players
Association football defenders
People from Dupnitsa
Sportspeople from Kyustendil Province